For the Record is the debut studio album by American rapper Torae, released on November 1, 2011 via his own imprint Internal Affairs Entertainment, in conjunction with Fat Beats Distribution. It was preceded by the collaborative project Double Barrel in 2009 with producer Marco Polo.

The album was executive produced by Torae, along with Rich "Filthy Rich" Ahee and Amber Ravenel. The music production was handled by renowned beatsmiths DJ Premier, Large Professor, Diamond D, and Pete Rock, as well as 9th Wonder, Illmind, and Marco Polo among others. The sole guest appearances are provided by Wes, Pav Bundy and MeLa Machinko. The album was mastered by Ricardo Gutierrez at Stadium Red in New York City. The album was supported by two singles – "That Raw" produced by Pete Rock, and "Do the Math" produced by Large Professor.

Critical reception

Upon its release, For the Record received generally favorable reviews from music critics. In his review for HipHopSite.Com, Nene Wallace Reed observed that "Three things help to make Torae the artist he is; his raw talent, his ear for production and his honesty. The combination of the three make the album a winner. For the Record is not only a strong introduction to Torae as an individual, it's out and out one of the best albums of 2011."  Jeff Leon of KevinNottingham wrote, "Torae delivers a solid ode to Hip Hop and a declaration of who he is and where he wants to go. Not all the beats on the record work perfectly and the emcee still has room to grow, but with this one, Torae leaves an indelible mark and shows that he's well on his way to becoming a Hip Hop heavyweight."

RapReviews founder Steve "Flash" Juon wrote, "There is nothing bad or whack about For the Record, so it may just be that at only 48 minutes long I'm simply disappointed there wasn't more content. Then again it may be that Torae suffers from Brooklynite soundalike syndrome, because to some degree he comes across like a less charismatic Jay-Z or Saigon, and as dope as his lines are they are often lacking in forceful intent."  Will Georgi wasn't hesitant to dub the album a classic. Writing for Okayplayer, he believed that "For the Record is the sound of a sharp MC rhyming over some dope beats from some of the best producers in the scene. If that doesn't make it a classic record, I don't know what is."  DJBooth reviewer Nathan S. wrote, "It'd be a mistake to stick the ol' 'underground' label on For the Record – you don't have to have a backpack full of Krylon to enjoy it – but it's safe to say Torae's not aiming for crossover radio success. This is a hip-hop album for people who love hip-hop and who want to hear the music they love, not the music a radio programmer thinks they should love."

Track listing

Sample credits
"Shakedown" contains a sample of "Legend of the Ninja" as performed by Alfredo Chen Singers;
"Do The Math" contains a sample of "Capture (Militia, Pt. 3)" as performed by Gang Starr, Big Shug and Freddie Foxxx; "Life As..." as 
"For the Record" contains a sample of "Eclipse" as performed by Ahmad Jamal; "What's Happenin'" as performed by Method Man and Busta Rhymes; Redman's verse in LL Cool J's "4, 3, 2, 1"; "Likwit" as performed by Tha Alkaholiks;
"Thank You" contains a sample of "Thank You Baby" as performed by Betty Wright.

Personnel
Credits for For the Record adapted from AllMusic.

 Rich "Filthy Rich" Ahee — engineer, executive producer, mixing, producer 
 Wesley "Wes" Brumfield — featured artist, vocals 
 Pav Bundy — featured artist 
 Torae "Torae" Carr —  engineer, executive producer, primary artist, producer
 Matt Conaway — publicity 
 Shawna Nichol Corso —  vocals 
 Ejor Danill — artwork 
 DJ E Holla — vocals 
 DJ Premier — engineer, mixing, producer 
 Patrick "9th Wonder" Douthit — engineer, producer, vocals  
 Eric "Eric G." Gabouer — producer 
 Ricardo Gutierrez — mastering 
 Fatin "Fatin" Horton —  engineer, producer
 Ramon "Illmind" Ibanga Jr. — mixing, producer 
 Calvin Jones — mixing 
 Eric "E. Jones" Jones —  producer
 Khrysis — producer 
 Joseph "Diamond D" Kirkland — producer
 Gary Lubansky — engineer 
 MeLa Machinko — featured artist 
 Marco Polo — engineer, producer
 William Paul "Large Professor" Mitchell —  producer
 Joe Nardone — mixing 
 Nottz — engineer, mixing, producer, vocals 
 Peter "Pete Rock" Phillips — producer
 Rah Digga — vocals 
 Amber Ravenel — executive producer 
 Marion O. Ross III — trumpet 
 D. Sloan — engineer, mixing 
 Noah Abraham Weston —  vocals

References

2011 debut albums
Hip hop albums by American artists
Torae albums
Albums produced by DJ Premier
Albums produced by Pete Rock
Albums produced by Marco Polo
Albums produced by Illmind
Albums produced by 9th Wonder
Albums produced by Khrysis
Albums produced by Nottz
Albums produced by Large Professor
Albums produced by Diamond D